Michael Leighton George Relph (16 February 1915 – 30 September 2004) was an English film producer, art director, screenwriter and  film director. He was the son of actor George Relph.

Films
Relph began his film career in 1933 as an assistant art director under Alfred Junge at Gaumont British then headed by Michael Balcon. In 1942 Relph began work at Ealing as chief art director, where his designs included the influential 1945 supernatural anthology Dead of Night.

He worked mainly on Basil Dearden's films, and in 1949 was nominated for an Academy Award for art direction for his work on the Stewart Granger vehicle Saraband for Dead Lovers (1948).

Theatre
Michael Relph also designed for the theatre, particularly the West End in the 1940s, from The Doctor's Dilemma and A Month in the Country, to Nap Hand and The Man Who Came to Dinner.

Producer
Relph is largely known as a film producer. He served as associate producer on the Ealing comedy Kind Hearts and Coronets (1949); and had a significant 20-year partnership with Basil Dearden beginning in 1949 and ending with Dearden's death in 1971. Their work included a series of social problem films examining issues such as racism (Pool of London and Sapphire), juvenile delinquency (Violent Playground), homosexuality (Victim), and religious intolerance (Life for Ruth). Relph believed that because film was "genuinely a mass medium," it therefore had "social and educative responsibilities as well as artistic ones." In their review of Life For Ruth, The New York Times wrote, "in avoiding blatant bias, mawkish sentimentality and theatrical flamboyance, it makes a statement that is dramatic, powerful and provocative."

From 1972 to 1979, Relph was chairman of the British Film Institute's Production Board.
Simultaneously he was the Chairman of the Film Production Association of Great Britain, and went on to be Head of Production for Boyd's Company in the 1980s,  where he helped foster the emerging talents of Derek Jarman (The Tempest) and Julien Temple (The Great Rock 'n' Roll Swindle).

Family
His son, Simon Relph, was also a film producer and former chairman of BAFTA. His daughter, Emma Relph, had several parts on television and in the films as an actress during the 1980s. His stepson Mark Law is a former Fleet Street journalist and author of The Pyjama Game, A Journey Into Judo.

Selected filmography

 They Drive by Night (1938) (art director)
 Went the Day Well? (1942) (assistant art director)
 The Bells Go Down (1943) (art director)
 My Learned Friend (1943) (art director)
 Champagne Charlie (1944) (art director)
 My Learned Friend (1943) (art director)
 The Halfway House (1944) (art director)
 They Came to a City (1944) (art director)
 Dead of Night (1945) (art director)
 The Captive Heart (1946) (producer, art director)
 The Life and Adventures of Nicholas Nickleby (1947) (art director)
 Frieda (1947) (producer, production designer)
 Saraband for Dead Lovers (1948) (producer, production designer)
 Kind Hearts and Coronets (1949) (producer)
 Train of Events (1949) (producer) 
 The Blue Lamp (1950) (producer)
 Cage of Gold (1950) (producer, production designer))
 Pool of London (1951) (producer)
 I Believe in You (1952) (director, producer, screenplay)
 The Gentle Gunman (1952) (producer)
 The Square Ring (1953) (producer)
 Out of the Clouds (1955) (producer, screenplay)
 The Rainbow Jacket (1954) (producer)
 The Ship That Died of Shame (1955) (producer, screenplay)
 Who Done It? (1956) (producer)
 The Smallest Show on Earth (1957) (producer)
 Rockets Galore! (1957) (director)
 Davy (1957) (director)
 Violent Playground (1958) (producer)
 Desert Mice (1959) (director, producer)
 Sapphire (1959) (producer)
 The League Of Gentlemen (1960) (producer)
 Man in the Moon (1960) (producer, screenplay)
 Victim (1961) (producer)
 The Secret Partner (1961) (producer)
 All Night Long (1961) (producer, production designer)
 Life for Ruth (1962) (producer)
 A Place to Go (1963) (producer, screenplay)
 The Mind Benders (1963) (producer)
 A Place to Go (1963) (producer, screenplay)
 Woman of Straw (1964) (producer, screenplay)
 Masquerade (1965) (producer, screenplay)
 The Assassination Bureau (1968) (producer, screenplay, production designer)
 The Man Who Haunted Himself (1970) (producer, screenplay)
 Scum (1979) (producer)
 An Unsuitable Job for a Woman (1982) (producer)
 Heavenly Pursuits (1986) (producer)
 Torrents of Spring (1989) (production consultant)

References

External links

The Cinema of Basil Dearden and Michael Relph
Michael-Relph

1915 births
2004 deaths
English film producers
English art directors
People educated at Bembridge School
People from Broadstone, Dorset
People from Selsey
20th-century English businesspeople